Cryogenic Studios is a compilation album that contains songs from several of Canadian electronic musician Bill Leeb's projects including Front Line Assembly, Equinox, Delerium, Pro>Tech, and Synæsthesia. It was released by Cleopatra in 1998. The album title refers to the name of Cryogenic Studio in Vancouver that serves as headquarters studio for Front Line Assembly and related side projects. The Zoth Ommog release for the European market came with a different artwork. All tracks except for "Infra Stellar (Remix)" were re-released in 2005 by Cleopatra on the compilation album The Best of Cryogenic Studio.

Track listing

"Equilibrium" and "The Flood" are previously unreleased.

Personnel

Front Line Assembly
 Bill Leeb – production, mixing (2–9)
 Chris Peterson – production (1–3, 7–9), mixing (2, 3, 7–9)
 Rhys Fulber – production (5, 6), mixing (5, 6)
 Michael Balch – production (4), mixing (4)

Technical personnel
 Greg Reely – mixing (1)
 Brian Gardner – mastering
 Carylann Loeppky – cover

References

Front Line Assembly compilation albums
1998 compilation albums
Cleopatra Records compilation albums
Industrial compilation albums
Albums produced by Chris Peterson (producer)
Albums produced by Rhys Fulber